The 2019 Asian Women's Junior Handball Championship was the 15th edition of the championship held from 20 to 29 July 2019 at Beirut, Lebanon under the aegis of Asian Handball Federation. It was the first time in history that championship was organised in Lebanon by the Lebanese Handball Federation. It also acted as the qualification tournament for the 2020 Women's Junior World Handball Championship.

Draw
The draw was held on 13 April 2019 at Lebanese Handball Federation Headquarters in Beirut, Lebanon.

Preliminary round
All times are local (UTC+3).

Group A

Group B

Knockout stage

Bracket

5–8th place bracket

5–8th place semifinals

Semifinals

Seventh place game

Fifth place game

Third place game

Final

Final standings

References

External links
Results

Asian Handball Championships
International handball competitions hosted by Lebanon
Asian Women's Junior Handball Championship
Asian Junior
Asian Women's Junior Handball Championship